Wallace Dickey was born February 15, 1941, in San Antonio, Texas, is a former American football tackle. He played for the Denver Broncos from 1968 to 1969 . Dickey attended Harlandale Independent School District in San Antonio, Texas, and went on to attend Texas State University He played 2 seasons for the Denver Broncos and appeared in 22 games.

References

1941 births
Living people
American football tackles
Texas State Bobcats football players
Denver Broncos players